Des Cole (27 October 1933 – 25 January 2015) was an Australian rules footballer who played with St Kilda in the Victorian Football League (VFL).

Notes

External links 

2015 deaths
1933 births
Australian rules footballers from Victoria (Australia)
St Kilda Football Club players